The Aswan Low Dam or Old Aswan Dam is a gravity masonry buttress dam on the Nile River in Aswan, Egypt. The dam was built by the British at the former first cataract of the Nile, and is located about 1000 km up-river and 690 km (direct distance) south-southeast of Cairo. When initially constructed between 1899 and 1902, nothing of its scale had ever been attempted; on completion, it was the largest masonry dam in the world. The dam was designed to provide storage of annual floodwater and augment dry season flows to support greater irrigation development and population growth in the lower Nile. The dam, originally limited in height by conservation concerns, worked as designed, but provided inadequate storage capacity for planned development and was raised twice: between 1907 and 1912 and again between 1929 and 1933. These heightenings still did not meet irrigation demands and in 1946 it was nearly over-topped in an effort to maximize pool elevation.

Background
The earliest recorded attempt to build a dam near Aswan was in the 11th century, when the Arab polymath and engineer Ibn al-Haytham (known as Alhazen in the West) was summoned to Egypt by the Fatimid Caliph, Al-Hakim bi-Amr Allah, to regulate the flooding of the Nile. After his field work convinced him of the impracticality of this scheme, and fearing the Caliph's anger, he feigned madness. He was kept under house arrest from 1011 until al-Hakim's death in 1021, during which time he wrote his influential Book of Optics.

Construction
Following their 1882 victory of the Anglo-Egyptian War leading to the  occupation of Egypt, the British began construction of the first dam across the Nile in 1898. Construction lasted until 1902, and it was opened on 10 December 1902, by Prince Arthur, Duke of Connaught and Strathearn. The project was designed by Sir William Willcocks and involved several eminent engineers of the time, including Sir Benjamin Baker and Sir John Aird, whose firm, John Aird & Co., was the main contractor. Capital and financing were furnished by Ernest Cassel.

The Old Aswan Dam was designed as a gravity-buttress dam; the buttress sections accommodate numerous gates, which were opened yearly to pass the flood and its nutrient-rich sediments, but without retaining any yearly storage. The dam was constructed of rubble masonry and faced with red ashlar granite. When constructed, the Old Aswan Dam was the largest masonry dam in the world. The design also included a navigation lock of similar construction on the western bank, which allowed shipping to pass upstream as far as the second cataract, whereas a portage overland was previously required. At the time of its construction, nothing of such scale had ever been attempted.

Heightening
Initial limitations were imposed on the dam's height, due to concern for the Philae Temple. Generation of electricity was added. The first phase was supervised by Sir Benjamin Baker, but much of the detailed work was undertaken by Murdoch MacDonald.

With the construction of the High Dam upstream, the Old Dam's ability to pass the flood's sediments was lost, as was the serviceability provided by the locks. The previous Old Dam reservoir level was also lowered and now provides control of tailwater for the High Dam.

Power plants
The Aswan Low Dam supports two hydroelectric power plants, Aswan I (1960) and Aswan II (1985–1986).

See also

 Energy in Egypt

Further reading
 Perennial irrigation and flood protection for Egypt. Reports of the Technical Commission on Reservoirs with a note by W.E. Garstin, under Secretary of State, Public Works Department. (1894) National Printing Office, Cairo.
 Sidney Peel, The Binding of the Nile and the new Soudan, Oxford 1904. Discusses 'Assouan' Dam and Nile River development.
 The Assuan Dam, Journal of the Royal African Society, Vol. 12, No. 46, January, 1913
 Hanbury Brown, Irrigation; its principles and practice as a branch of engineering, Third Edition, London. 1920

References 

Dams completed in 1902
Energy infrastructure completed in 1933
Energy infrastructure completed in 1960
Energy infrastructure completed in 1980
Energy infrastructure completed in 1985
Aswan
Buildings and structures in Aswan Governorate
Dams on the Nile
Dams in Egypt
Hydroelectric power stations in Egypt
Gravity dams
Masonry dams
1902 establishments in Egypt
20th-century architecture in Egypt